The Man Who Lies is a 1968 French-Czechoslovak drama art film directed by Alain Robbe-Grillet. It was entered into the 18th Berlin International Film Festival, where Jean-Louis Trintignant won the Silver Bear for Best Actor award.

Plot
In a small European town that had been occupied by the German Army during the Second World War a man turns up calling himself sometimes Jean and sometimes Boris, claiming that he had been active in the Resistance. He suffers flashbacks that disconcertingly reveal incompatible memories of his role, as sometimes he is the hero Jean, shot by the Germans, and sometimes he is the traitor Boris. Nobody in the town admits to remembering him, which increases his alienation and his urge to gain recognition.

In a decayed mansion he finds three secluded women: the widow of Jean, the sister of Jean, and the maid Maria. Starting with Maria, he attempts to convince them about his activities during the war, even if his accounts keep differing. Maria succumbs to his approaches and sleeps with him, as soon after does the sister. Before he can claim the widow, in the role of Boris he is apparently shot dead by an undead Jean.

Cast
 Jean-Louis Trintignant as Jean Robin / Boris Varissa
 Ivan Mistrík as Jean
 Zuzana Kocúriková as Laura
 Sylvie Turbová as Sylvia
 Sylvie Bréal as Maria, the maid
 Jozef Cierny as Father
 Jozef Króner as Franz
 Dominique Prado as Lisa, the barmaid
 Dusan Blaskovic as Innkeeper
 Catherine Robbe-Grillet as Pharmacist
 Július Vasek as Vladimír
 Ivan Letko as German officer

References

External links

1968 films
Czechoslovak drama films
1960s French-language films
1968 drama films
French black-and-white films
Films directed by Alain Robbe-Grillet
Fiction with unreliable narrators
Slovak drama films
French drama films
1960s French films